Fengyou Essence is a type of Chinese patent medicine, usually in the form of an oily liquid with a light green color. It is derived from countries in Southeast Asia where the weather is warm and wet with the prevalence of mosquitoes because it serves a great deal in relieving itchiness. In China, it is sometimes called "panacea oil" as it is believed to alleviate the symptoms of many diseases ranging from coughing and rhinitis to the cold and flu.

Ingredients 
According to China's Food and Medicine Administration, Fengyou Essence ingredients include liquid paraffin, chlorophyll, menthol, methyl salicylate, camphor, eucalyptus oil, and eugenol.

Uses 
Fengyou Essence is mainly used after mosquito bites to preventing further itching, for easing headaches or dizziness due to a cold, and for carsickness, pain relief, cooling, and reducing rheumatic pains. It can either be used externally on the skin or taken orally, but people with deep second degree burns or more severe burns are prohibited from using it.

Although taking the product orally is permitted in its instructions, it is advised not to as to avoid adverse reactions such intestinal stimulations as one of its ingredients methyl salicylate can lead to poisoning if taken too much, and is suggested by the FDA to avoid.

Mechanism to prevent itchiness 
Humans feel like itching their skin after mosquito bites because mosquitoes inject their saliva containing irritable chemicals when drawing out blood. The foreign substances inside the saliva then triggers the body's immune system that releases histamine to help white blood cells get to the bitten area. As white blood cells travel to the effected area, it causes itchiness.  Menthol and eucalyptus oil in the Fengyou Essence activate specialized nerve cells responsible for sensing temperature, producing the feeling of coldness on the skin. Methyl salicylate could also irritate the skin, causing a burning sensation. Due to the two types of stimulations acting together at the same time, it covers the itchiness. However, the histamine itself does not disappear. It's because as the time goes, body becomes less and less sensitive. For healing headaches and dizziness, it functions the same.

Potential side-effects 
There are only a few side-effects found by some individuals with allergic constitution. However, if one takes more dosage than recommended, the ingredients of the essence may harm the body. Methyl salicylate and camphor in the essence are both toxic. Under normal usage, after camphor enters the human body, the glucose phosphoric acid dehydrogenase in the body can be combined with the substance very quickly, de-toxifying the material. Then it is discharged out of body through urine. Therefore this will not produce adverse reaction. Yet, studies have shown that taking too much camphor at once can cause poisoning, such as nausea, vomiting, abdominal pain, oropharyngeal irritation and, in severe cases, refractory seizures.

Forbidden groups

Notable brands 
"Eagle Branded Fengyou Essence" (Medicated Oil) is the origin of most of the Fengyou Essence popular in China. Additionally, local brands like "Shuixian", "Baiyunshan", "Longhu" are frequently seen in pharmacy and grocery stores in China.

References 

Traditional Chinese medicine pills
Traditional Chinese medicine